This list shows the government budget of each country divided by its total population, not adjusted to purchasing power parity. It is based on data from the 2018 CIA World Factbook. The Chinese, Brazilian, Indian, and United States government budgets used are the figures reported by the International Monetary Fund.

List

See also  
 List of countries by tax revenue to GDP ratio
 List of countries by government spending as percentage of GDP
 List of countries by total health expenditure per capita
 List of countries by household final consumption expenditure per capita
 List of countries by military expenditure per capita

Notes

References 

government budget per capita